Edward Arthur Killy (January 26, 1903 – July 2, 1981) was an American director, assistant director and production manager in films and television. He was one of the few individuals to be nominated for the short-lived Academy Award for Best Assistant Director. During his 30-year career he worked on over 75 films and television shows.

Life and career
Killy was born on January 26, 1903, in Connecticut. He entered the film industry as an assistant director at RKO Pictures, his first film being the 1931 musical comedy, Caught Plastered, directed by William Seiter, and starring the comedy duo of Bert Wheeler and Robert Woolsey. Over the next five years he assisted on over a dozen films, many of them notable films. In 1932 he was one of two assistants to George Cukor on the drama What Price Hollywood?, starring Constance Bennett and Lowell Sherman. In 1933 he was one of several assistants to Dorothy Arzner on the melodrama Christopher Strong, which featured Katharine Hepburn in her first starring role. He worked with Hepburn on two more films in 1933, Morning Glory (one of three assisting Lowell Sherman), and one of two assisting Cukor on the classic, Little Women. That year he also assisted Seiter again on another Wheeler & Woolsey comedy, Diplomaniacs, as well as being one of three assistants to Thornton Freeland on the RKO musical Flying Down to Rio, which featured the first on-screen pairing of Fred Astaire and Ginger Rogers. The following year Killy assisted Philip Moeller on the classic drama The Age of Innocence, the first talking version of the novel, starring Irene Dunne and John Boles.

He worked with Hepburn again, being one of three assistants to Richard Wallace on The Little Minister. It was during the filming of this movie when Killy gained notoriety by telling off Hepburn. She was acting up on set one day and refusing to take her place on set, so he told her, "Get on the set before you're sent back to New York to do another Lake." However, he soon became one of her favorite assistant directors.

In 1935 Killy became part of a concerted effort on RKO's part to build a cadre of young directors. His first assignment as the main man behind the camera was as co-director with William Hamilton, on the 1935 film Freckles, based on the 1904 novel of the same name. The two would again pair up to direct the 1935 version of Seven Keys to Baldpate, starring Gene Raymond and Margaret Callahan. The pair co-directed two more films before Killy was given his first solo directing assignment, 1936's Second Wife, starring Gertrude Michael and Walter Abel. Over the next ten years, he directed another 20 films, mostly B movie Westerns, and being the chief director for Tim Holt's Westerns.
Some of the oater collaborations between Killy and Holt include: The Fargo Kid (1940), Wagon Train (1940), Along the Rio Grande (1941), and Land of the Open Range (1942). In the mid-1940s, a young actor, Robert Mitchum, was signed to a seven-year contract with RKO, with the intent of making B-Westerns based on Zane Grey novels. Killy was assigned the first of these films, 1944's Nevada. He would also direct Mitchum in another film adaptation of a Grey novel, 1945's West of the Pecos, which was also Killy's last credit as the director of a film.

Even after getting the opportunity to take the helm of films, Killy was one of the rare people to continue to work at the assistant director level. As an assistant he worked on several notable features including: Roberta, directed by Seiter, and starring Irene Dunne, Fred Astaire, Ginger Rogers, and Randolph Scott; again with Hepburn on Alice Adams (1935), with George Stevens directing; the classic war film Gunga Din, again directed by Stevens, and starring Cary Grant, Victor McLaglen, and Douglas Fairbanks Jr.; The Hunchback of Notre Dame (1939), assisting William Dieterle, and starring Charles Laughton as Quasimodo and Maureen O'Hara as Esmeralda; Gregory La Cava's Primrose Path, starring Ginger Rogers and Joel McCrea; Bombardier (1943), directed by Richard Wallace, and starring Pat O'Brien and Randolph Scott; 1944's romantic comedy, also directed by Wallace, Bride by Mistake, starring Alan Marshal and Laraine Day; Susan Slept Here (1954), a romantic comedy directed by Frank Tashlin and starring Debbie Reynolds and Dick Powell in his final film performance; and the Howard Hughes' production of The Conqueror, directed by Dick Powell, and starring John Wayne.

In the late 1940s through the 1950s, Killy would also occasionally work as a production manager on such films as: Blood on the Moon (1948), The Big Steal (1949), Angel Face, Jet Pilot, and All Mine to Give (1958).

Killy married Pauline Watkins, and would remain married to her until his death in 1981. The two adopted a daughter in the 1930s, Audrey K. Killy. Killy died July 2, 1981, in Orange County, California.

Filmography

(Per AFI database)

Caught Plastered  (1931) - Assistant director
Too Many Cooks  (1931) - Assistant director
What Price Hollywood?  (1932) - Assistant director
Diplomaniacs  (1933) - Assistant director
Bed of Roses  (1933) - Assistant director
Emergency Call  (1933) - Assistant director
Christopher Strong  (1933) - Assistant director
Morning Glory  (1933) - Assistant director
Little Women  (1933) - Assistant director
Flying Down to Rio  (1933) - Assistant director
Finishing School  (1934) - Assistant director
Sing and Like It  (1934) - Assistant director
The Little Minister  (1934) - Assistant director
Down to Their Last Yacht  (1934) - Assistant director
Hips, Hips, Hooray!  (1934) - Assistant director
The Age of Innocence  (1934) - Assistant director
Break of Hearts  (1935) - Assistant director
Seven Keys to Baldpate  (1935) - Director
Alice Adams  (1935) - Assistant director
Freckles  (1935) - Director
Roberta  (1935) - Assistant director
The Big Game  (1936) - Director
Murder on a Bridle Path  (1936) - Director
Bunker Bean  (1936) - Director
Second Wife  (1936) - Director
Wanted! Jane Turner  (1936) - Director
Criminal Lawyer  (1937) - Director
Saturday's Heroes  (1937) - Director
Quick Money  (1937) - Director
The Big Shot  (1937) - Director
China Passage  (1937) - Director
5th Avenue Girl  (1939) - Assistant director
Bachelor Mother  (1939) - Assistant director
The Hunchback of Notre Dame  (1939) - Assistant director
Gunga Din  (1939) - Assistant director
The Flying Irishman  (1939) - Assistant director
Primrose Path  (1940) - Assistant director
The Fargo Kid  (1940) - Director
Wagon Train  (1940) - Director
Triple Justice  (1940) - Assistant director
Stage to Chino  (1940) - Director
Along the Rio Grande  (1941) - Director
The Bandit Trail  (1941) - Director
Come on Danger  (1941) - Director
Cyclone on Horseback  (1941) - Director
Robbers of the Range  (1941) - Director
Land of the Open Range  (1942) - Director
The Navy Comes Through  (1942) - Assistant director
Riding the Wind  (1942) - Director
The Tuttles of Tahiti  (1942) - Assistant director
The Iron Major  (1943) - Assistant director
Bombardier  (1943) - Assistant director
Marine Raiders  (1944) - Assistant director
Nevada  (1944) - Director
Bride by Mistake  (1944) - Assistant director
Wanderer of the Wasteland  (1945) - Director
West of the Pecos  (1945) - Director
Sinbad the Sailor  (1947) - Production assistant
Tycoon  (1947) - Production assistant
Blood on the Moon  (1948) - Production manager
Adventure in Baltimore  (1949) - Production manager
The Big Steal  (1949) - Production manager
The Set-Up  (1949) - Assistant director
Stromboli  (1950) - Production manager
The Lusty Men  (1952) - Assistant director
Androcles and the Lion  (1953) - Production manager
Angel Face  (1953) - Unit manager
She Couldn't Say No  (1954) - Unit production manager
Dangerous Mission  (1954) - Unit production manager
Susan Slept Here  (1954) - Assistant director
The Girl Rush  (1955) - Assistant director
The Conqueror  (1956) - Assistant director
Run for the Sun  (1956) - Assistant director
Tension at Table Rock  (1956) - Unit manager
Jet Pilot  (1957) - Unit production manager
Gunsight Ridge (1957) - Assistant director
All Mine to Give  (1958) - Unit manager

References

1903 births
1981 deaths
American film directors
Assistant directors
Unit production managers